Andrea Tessitore (born May 25, 1973) is an Italian lawyer and entrepreneur, co-founder of Italia Independent Group with Lapo Elkann and Giovanni Accongiagioco. He has been CEO of Italia Independent Group until November 2016. Since April 2017 he is senior advisor of Elite - Borsa Italiana. He is responsible for the project Elite - Confindustria which aims to accelerate the growth of the Elite international platform.

Life and career
Andrea Tessitore pursued his law degree from the  University of Turin, Department of Law. In the year 2000 he graduated an LLM from the University of Virginia School of Law.
In 2001 he qualified as a lawyer in the state of New York, joining the New York State Bar Association.
In 2007 he founded with Giovanni Accongiagioco and Lapo Elkann, Italia Independent, a lifestyle design company which core business is eyewear and sunglasses.
He is married to Celine Sarda De Castilla with whom he had three children: Achille, Allegra and Olimpia.

Awards and honors
Together with the founding partners of Italia Independent Group, he won the 2014 EY Award Entrepreneur of the Year in the “Emerging” category.
In March 2016, he was nominated as a member of the Executive Board of the Comitato Leonardo.

References

External links
 Andrea Tessitore Press conference at Baselworld 2015
 Andrea Tessitore - Interview

1973 births
Living people
Jurists from Turin
Businesspeople from Turin
University of Turin alumni
University of Virginia School of Law alumni
New York (state) lawyers
21st-century Italian lawyers